Paul Perry may refer to:

Paul Perry (author) (fl. 1980s–2020s), American writer
Paul Perry (cinematographer) (1891–1963), American cinematographer
Paul Perry (horse trainer) (born 1949), Australian racehorse trainer

See also
Perry (surname)
Paul Perri (born 1953), American-Canadian actor